Cletus Segbe Wotorson (born 13 March 1937) is a Liberian politician and geologist. On March 26, 2009 he was elected as President Pro Tempore of the Senate of Liberia, beating out fellow Senator Gbehzohngar Milton Findley. He served until 2012.

Positions
Assistant Professor of Geology & Geophysics – University of Liberia
Director – Liberian Geological Survey (1973–1975)
Founder & President – West Africa Consultants (1975–1978)
Minister of Lands & Mines – Government of Liberia (1978–1980)
Chairman – Liberian Petroleum Refinery Company (1978–1980)
Chairman & CEO – Liberian Petroleum Refinery Company (1980–1983)
President – Nimba Mining Company (1988–1990)
Standard Bearer of the Alliance of Political Parties in the 1997 presidential election. He placed fourth out of thirteen candidates, winning 2.57% of the vote

References

1937 births
Living people
Academic staff of the University of Liberia
Members of the Senate of Liberia
Presidents pro tempore of the Senate of Liberia
Candidates for President of Liberia
Government ministers of Liberia
Unity Party (Liberia) politicians
People from Grand Kru County
20th-century Liberian politicians
21st-century Liberian politicians